Alba Parietti (born 2 July 1961) is an Italian television presenter, television personality, showgirl, actress and former singer.

Early life 
Parietti was born on 2 July 1961 in Turin, Piedmont, Italy, daughter of Francesco, a Piedmontese partisan originally from the Langhe then a chemist, whose nom de guerre was Naviga and Grazia Dipietromaria, painter and writer. She has been named after Alba where the partisans instaurated the Republic of Alba in 1944. She began her career in 1977 with an appearance in the theatrical play, The Importance of Being Earnest, by Oscar Wilde. Although she did appear on television as early as 1975, her first role was in a major theatrical film in 1983 in Sapore di Mare (American version entitled Time for Loving). Parietti has since performed in many films, including the 1991 comedy film , as Aurora.

In February 1992, Parietti co-hosted the Sanremo Music Festival alongside Pippo Baudo in Sanremo, Italy.

Personal life 
She gave birth to her only child, a son on 6 April 1982, with her ex-husband Franco Oppini.

Discography

Studio albums
ALBA (1996)

Extended plays
Alba da sentire (1990)

Singles
Only Music Survives (1985)
Jump and Do It (1985)
Look Into My Eyes (1985)
Dangerous (1987)

Filmography

Films

Television

External links 
 

1961 births
Living people
Italian film actresses
Italian stage actresses
Italian television actresses
Italian television presenters
Actors from Turin
Italian women television presenters
20th-century Italian actresses
Mass media people from Turin